Fuhua may refer to:

Fuhua Primary School in Jurong East, Singapore
Fuhua Secondary School in Jurong West, Singapore